The Colombia national ice hockey team is the national men's ice hockey team of Colombia, is controlled by the Colombian Ice Hockey Federation, and on 26 September 2019, became an associate member of the International Ice Hockey Federation (IIHF). Colombia is currently not ranked in the IIHF World Ranking and has not entered in any IIHF World Championship events. They are working on the women's national ice hockey team and have participated in the Amerigol LATAM Cup some years and other tournaments like the Pan American Ice Hockey Tournament.

History
Colombia made its debut on 2 March 2014, and played its first game against Argentina at the 2014 Pan American Ice Hockey Tournament being held in Mexico City. Colombia was one of five teams to participate in the tournament, which included Argentina, Brazil, Mexico and a selection team from Canada. After winning their opening game of the tournament against Argentina, The team had two straight losses to Canada and Mexico. They completed the round robin off with a 14–0 win over Brazil. They were drawn against Argentina for the bronze medal match, which they went on to a 9–1 win.

On 13 September 2022, Colombia played a friendly match against Argentina at the NHL's Florida Panthers home ice arena, the FLA Live Arena, in Sunrise, Florida, before the 2022 Amerigol LATAM Cup began. They completed with a 7–3 win over Argentina.

Tournament record

Pan American Tournament

Amerigol LATAM Cup

IIHF Development Cup

All-time record against other nations
Last match update: 11 June 2017

References

National ice hockey teams in the Americas
Ice hockey